Cavendish University  may refer to

Cavendish University Tanzania, affiliated with Cavendish University Uganda
Cavendish University Uganda
Cavendish University Zambia

See also
Cavendish College (disambiguation)